In Ancient Greek mythology, Olethros  was the personification of havoc and probably one of the Makhai.

Olethros translates roughly in ancient Greek to "destruction", but often with a positive connotation, as in the destruction required for and preceding renewal.

Biblical use of olethros

Strong's Exhaustive Concordance of the King James Bible defines the word as meaning "ruin"; i.e., death, punishment, or destruction. Olethros is found in the New Testament in 1 Corinthians 5:5, 1 Thessalonians 5:3, 2 Thessalonians 1:9, and 1 Timothy 6:9, where it is translated "destruction" in most versions of the Bible. Some believe a more accurate translation of this word in these verses would be "punishment," referring to the kind of punishment that expiates guilt and restores the sinner to communion with God.

In popular culture
The name "Olethros" is used to refer to Destruction in The Sandman series written by Neil Gaiman.

See also 

 Alala
 Alke
 Coalemus
 Homados
 Ioke
 Palioxis
 Polemus
 Proioxis

Greek gods
Personifications in Greek mythology
First Epistle to the Corinthians
First Epistle to the Thessalonians
Second Epistle to the Thessalonians
First Epistle to Timothy
Olethros Greek myths